Angelo Raine (1877 – 5 October 1962) was a British clergyman, antiquarian, and archivist.

Biography
Raine was born in York in 1877, one of nine children born to parents James Raine and Annie (nee Keyworth). As a child he lived in Petergate and attended St Peter's School. Raine was awarded a licence in theology from Durham University in 1900, later taking a Bachelor of Arts in 1903.

He was ordained as a priest in York Minster and subsequently left to work in East London at the Oxford House settlement project. Whilst in London, Raine became a Curate at Christ Church, Stepney. During the First World War he served at St Martin-on-the-Hill, Scarborough and also in Whitby before moving to the Church of St Edward the Confessor in Dringhouses in 1919. Angelo's wife was the first woman to attend the Annual General Meeting of the parish in 1920. In 1937 he left Dringhouses to become Vicar of All Saints, Pavement, a position he held until his retirement in 1956. A wooden plaque in the church records the dedication of the West window to him.

During his time in York, Raine followed his father's interest in archaeology and history. He served as Chaplain to the Merchant Adventurers of York and as the Honorary City Archivist. He was elected to the Council of the Yorkshire Philosophical Society in 1929 and served as a Vice-President for the society from 1933.

In 1956 he retired and moved to Suffolk. After his death in 1962 he was buried in the family grave at York Cemetery.

Publications
Raine, A. 1922. "Roman Inscribed stones found at York", Yorkshire Archaeological Journal 26, 389. 
Raine, A. 1926. History of St. Peter's School : York : A.D. 627 to the present day.
Raine, A. 1932. "Roman Excavations at York", in A Scientific Survey of York and District (British Association Handbook).
Raine, A. 1933. "The birth-place of Guy Fawkes". Yorkshire Architect York Archaeol Soc Proc 1.
Raine, A. 1948. "Recent Archaeological Work on Roman York", Archaeological Newsletter 6, 7–9.
Raine, A. 1955. Medieval York: A Topographic Survey Based on Original Sources

References

1877 births
1962 deaths
Alumni of Hatfield College, Durham
People educated at St Peter's School, York
English antiquarians
Clergy from York
People from York
British archivists
Members of the Yorkshire Philosophical Society